Melville Township is one of twelve townships in Audubon County, Iowa, United States.  As of the 2010 census, its population was 117.

History
Melville Township was organized in 1874.

Geography
According to the USGS, it contains one cemetery, Melville Township.

References

External links
 US-Counties.com
 City-Data.com

Townships in Audubon County, Iowa
Townships in Iowa
1874 establishments in Iowa
Populated places established in 1874